Sneathiella glossodoripedis is a Gram-negative, mesophilic, strictly aerobic, rod-shaped and motile bacterium from the genus of Sneathiella which has been isolated from the sea slug Glossodoris cincta.

References

External links
Type strain of Sneathiella glossodoripedis at BacDive -  the Bacterial Diversity Metadatabase

Alphaproteobacteria
Bacteria described in 2008